The Evansville Terminal Subdivision is a railroad line owned by CSX Transportation in the U.S. State of Indiana. The line is located in Evansville, Indiana. The Evansville Terminal Subdivision comprises the City Yard (1.0 miles), Howell Yard (3.5 miles), Old Belt Main (2.8 miles), Old City Main (1.6 miles), Wansford Main (5.3 miles) and the Yankeetown Lead.

See also
 List of CSX Transportation lines

References

CSX Transportation lines
Rail infrastructure in Indiana